Buffalo Center is a city in Winnebago County, Iowa, United States. The population was 857 at the time of the 2020 census. Its ZIP code is 50424.

History
Buffalo Center was platted in 1892, and was incorporated as a city later that same year. In 1996, Buffalo Center officially became the host community of the newly-formed North Iowa Community School.[4]

Located seven miles south of the Minnesota border, the town was named Buffalo Center because it was midway between the north and south forks of Buffalo Creek. The town was originally built south of the present site and moved north when the Chicago and Iowa Western Railroad set up lines in northern Iowa. It was settled in 1892 on mostly swampy ground, later dredged and tiled.  One of the original settlers, Howard Pomeroy, took a mower and mowed through his wheat fields to show where the streets would be, and a hardware store and a blacksmith shop were the first business enterprises in the new town.

Buffalo Center has survived a number of devastating fires, which have ravaged Main Street businesses over and over, and the occasional tornado, as well as several winter storms and blizzards. One of the most severe was the historic Armistice Day blizzard of November 11, 1940, which killed 154 people throughout Iowa, Minnesota, Wisconsin, and Michigan. 

On August 23, 1897, Buffalo Center became the first school system west of the Mississippi River to be consolidated, and it is believed to be the second one in the nation.

Today, Buffalo Center is a thriving town of about 1000 people.  We have a large new community center, our first museum, several new businesses and a K-12 consolidated school that educates students from Buffalo Center, Rake, Lakota and Thompson.

Our 4th of July celebration is a well-known all-day holiday which features a 5K, a parade, music in the park, tournaments, games and contests for the kids, and a huge fireworks display.  Other annual events include the Winter Gala, the summer Meat & Music Festival, Crazy Days, the Firemen's Dance in July, and the Old-Fashioned Christmas Celebration in December.

Geography
Buffalo Center is located at  (43.386497, -93.948241).

Demographics

2010 census
As of the census of 2010, there were 905 people, 405 households, and 242 families living in the city. The racial makeup of the city was 96.1% White, 0.6% African American, 0.6% Native American, 0.2% Asian, 2.1% from other races, and 0.4% from two or more races. Hispanic or Latino of any race were 6.0% of the population.

There were 405 households, of which 27.4% had children under the age of 18 living with them, 47.4% were married couples living together, 7.9% had a female householder with no husband present, 4.4% had a male householder with no wife present, and 40.2% were non-families. 37.8% of all households were made up of individuals, and 23% had someone living alone who was 65 years of age or older. The average household size was 2.15 and the average family size was 2.81.

The median age in the city was 48.3 years. 23.1% of residents were under the age of 18; 4.8% were between the ages of 18 and 24; 17.9% were from 25 to 44; 24% were from 45 to 64; and 30.2% were 65 years of age or older. The gender makeup of the city was 46.6% male and 53.4% female.

2000 census
As of the census of 2000, there were 963 people, 432 households, and 269 families living in the city. The racial makeup of the city was 98.44% White, 0.31% Asian, 1.04% from other races, and 0.21% from two or more races. Hispanic or Latino of any race were 2.60% of the population.

There were 432 households, out of which 22.5% had children under the age of 18 living with them, 54.4% were married couples living together, 5.8% had a female householder with no husband present, and 37.7% were non-families. 35.9% of all households were made up of individuals, and 24.8% had someone living alone who was 65 years of age or older. The average household size was 2.10 and the average family size was 2.70.

19.6% are under the age of 18, 5.7% from 18 to 24, 17.0% from 25 to 44, 20.8% from 45 to 64, and 36.9% who were 65 years of age or older. The median age was 49 years. For every 100 females, there were 88.5 males. For every 100 females age 18 and over, there were 81.7 males.

The median income for a household in the city was $30,694, and the median income for a family was $43,333. Males had a median income of $33,542 versus $21,875 for females. The per capita income for the city was $17,944. About 6.5% of families and 9.0% of the population were below the poverty line, including 8.6% of those under age 18 and 12.9% of those age 65 or over.

Education
It is within the North Iowa Community School District, which was established on July 1, 1996, by the merger of the Buffalo Center–Rake–Lakota Community School District and the Thompson Community School District.

An independent school district coinciding with the Buffalo township was established after a vote on December 13, 1895. It was renamed in 1897 to the Buffalo Center Consolidated School District. The Buffalo Center Community School District was formed on July 1, 1954, by the merger of five one-room schoolhouse districts, with the establishment of a centralized school approved by the board in August of that year. The Buffalo Center district merged with the Rake Community School District to form the Buffalo Center–Rake district on July 1, 1978. On July 1, 1992, Buffalo Center-Rake merged with the Lakota Consolidated School District to form the Buffalo Center–Rake–Lakota district, and that district merged with Thompson to form North Iowa in 1996.

Buffalo Center has a high school, North Iowa Community School, located in the town. It was the first consolidated school west of the Mississippi River. North Iowa Community School consists of students from Buffalo Center, as well as the three surrounding, smaller communities of Lakota, located to the west; Rake, to the north; and Thompson, to the east. The school's mascot is the  Bison, which had beem Buffalo Center's mascot for many years. At the time of Buffalo Center's merger with Rake in 1978, the Bison had been members of the eight-team North Iowa Conference since the league was founded in 1929. Meanwhile, the Rake High School Tigers, Lakota Eagles, and Thompson Cubs had all belonged to the 11-member State Line Conference. Thompson had been one of the six founding members, along with Ledyard, Swea City, Ringsted, Armstrong, and Burt. Lakota had joined the State Line Conference in 1942, and Rake in 1958. Rake had been the only member of the Conference to not have girls' basketball.

In 2015, North Iowa High School became one of the nine founding members of the Top of Iowa Conference - West.

References

External links
 Buffalo Center, Iowa (City Website)
 Buffalo Center Tribune
 North Iowa Community School

Cities in Iowa
Cities in Winnebago County, Iowa
1892 establishments in Iowa